The International Society of Olympic Historians (ISOH) is a non-profit organization founded in 1991 with the purpose of promoting and studying the Olympic Movement and the Olympic Games. The majority of recent books on the Olympic Games have been written by ISOH members. The ISOH publishes the Journal of Olympic History (JOH, formerly Citius, Altius, Fortius) three times a year.

History

The International Society of Olympic Historians was formed as the result of a meeting in London, England, in December 1991. The idea of forming an Olympic historical society had been the subject of correspondence – mainly between Bill Mallon (United States) and Ture Widlund (Sweden) – for many years. On Thursday, 5 December 1991, a group of potential members met at the Duke of Clarence, a small pub in the Kensington section of London.  Those present were Ian Buchanan (Great Britain), Stan Greenberg (Great Britain), Ove Karlsson (Sweden), Bill Mallon (United States), Peter Matthews (Great Britain), David Wallechinsky (United States), and Ture Widlund (Sweden). The invited guests who sent regrets were: Anthony Bijkerk (Netherlands), Peter Diamond (United States), Pim Huurman (Netherlands), Erich Kamper (Austria), Volker Kluge (Germany), John Lucas (United States), and Wolf Lyberg (Sweden).

ISOH was formed with the purpose of promoting and studying the Olympic Movement and the Olympic Games. This purpose is achieved primarily through research into their history, through the gathering of historical and statistical data concerning the Olympic Movement and Olympic Games, through the publication of the research via journals and other publications, and through the cooperation of the membership.

From its inception to 2000, Ian Buchanan has been the president of the ISOH. In 2000, this function was taken over by Bill Mallon. From 2004 to 2012 Dr. Karl Lennartz (Germany) and from 2012 to 2020 David Wallechinsky (United States) served as presidents. Since 2020 the archaeologist and sports historian Dr. Christian Wacker (Germany) is president.

Journal of Olympic History

The ISOH publishes the Journal of Olympic History (formerly Citius, Altius, Fortius).

Membership

, the ISOH has about 340 members from 48 nations.ISOH 2007, cited. The membership includes well-known Olympic historians and researchers on Olympic topics. The majority of recent books on the Olympic Games have been written by ISOH members. Over 20 ISOH members have received the Olympic Order for their contributions to the Olympic Movement, and several members of the IOC and several Olympians are members.ISOH 2007, cited. Other members are collectors of Olympic memorabilia, such as Raleigh DeGeer Amyx.

See also

 Sports history organizations

References

 Sources consulted 

 

 Endnotes

External links

 

Sports organizations established in 1991
History of the Olympics
Historical societies
International non-profit organizations
1991 establishments in England